Table tennis at the 2011 Pacific Games in Nouméa, New Caledonia was held on August 29–September 8, 2011.

Medal summary

Medal table

Results

References

Table tennis at the 2011 Pacific Games

2011 Pacific Games
Pacific Games
2011 Pacific Games
2011 Pacific Games
2011